A hat-trick in cricket is when a bowler takes three wickets on consecutive deliveries, dismissing three different batsmen. It is a relatively rare event in One Day International (ODI) cricket with only 49 occurrences in 4222 matches since the first ODI match between Australia and England on 5 January 1971. The first ODI hat-trick was taken by Pakistan's Jalal-ud-Din against Australia in Hyderabad, Sindh, in September 1982. The most recent player to achieve this feat is Kuldeep Yadav of India against West Indies in December 2019.

The only bowler to have taken three ODI hat-tricks is Sri Lanka's Lasith Malinga. Five other bowlers Pakistan's Wasim Akram and Saqlain Mushtaq, Sri Lanka's Chaminda Vaas, New Zealand's Trent Boult and India's Kuldeep Yadavhave taken two hat-tricks in the format. Hat-tricks are dominated by spinners. Vaas is the first and only bowler to claim a hat-trick on the first three balls of any form of international cricket; he achieved the feat against Bangladesh during the 2003 World Cup. Malinga is the only player to claim four wickets in consecutive balls; he achieved the feat against South Africa in the 2007 World Cup. Four players have taken a hat-trick on their ODI debuts: Bangladesh's Taijul Islam against Zimbabwe in 2014, South Africa's Kagiso Rabada against Bangladesh in 2015, Sri Lanka's Wanindu Hasaranga against Zimbabwe in 2017, and Sri Lanka's Shehan Madushanka against Bangladesh in 2018. India's Chetan Sharma was the first cricketer to take a hat-trick in a World Cup match. Eleven hat-tricks have been taken in World Cup matches.

Pakistani's Wasim Akram and Mohammad Sami are the only players to have taken hat-tricks in ODIs and Tests. Brett Lee (Australia), Lasith Malinga, Thisara Perera, Wanindu Hasaranga (all 3 from Sri Lanka) and Kagiso Rabada are the only players to have taken hat-tricks in ODIs and Twenty20 matches.

Hat-tricks

Key

By teams

By players

By grounds

See also
 List of Test cricket hat-tricks
 List of Twenty20 International cricket hat-tricks
 List of women's international cricket hat-tricks

Notes
A.  Last three wickets of the innings

B.  Aaqib Javed ended with 7–37, then the best bowling figures in an ODI.

C.  Four wickets in five deliveries

D.  First three wickets of the innings

E.  Vaas took 8–19; this is the only time that a bowler has taken eight wickets in an ODI.

F.  First three deliveries of the match

G.  Four wickets in four deliveries

H.  Hat-trick spanned two overs

I.  Hat-trick on debut

References
General
 

Specific

One Day International
One Day International cricket records